The Todi Castle is a former medieval Castle located 15 km south of the town of Todi, to the east side of the town of , which is part of the Municipality of Baschi, near Terni, in Umbria, Italy.

The Castle of Capecchio
The Castle of Capecchio was built during Roman times, in order to protect the Colonia Julia Fida Tuder (Todi Roman name) for the southern boundary line. Torre d'Orlando (former name of the watch tower) was built in a strategic position, to look over the area bounded by the river Tiber, the river Arnata and a famous Roman road, the Via Amerina, which linked Todi to Lazio. Its strategic function continued into the 8th-century, when Desiderius, the last Lombard king of Italy granted the territory of the Julia colony to the Papacy.

Five hundred years later, in 1275, it became the Diocese of Todi and then the Municipality of Todi. The Municipality of Baschi wanted total control of the area, so more than 5000 men were dedicated to build a large fortification system which included towers and fortresses, city walls, and fortified historic towns.

In the Castle of Capecchio several additional towers were built in the 10-13th centuries and the original tower was incorporated into a now larger fort or Rocca. There were three towers in the corners and a large bastion wall to protect the wide territory. The castle was important during the wars between Guelphs and Ghibellines in the 13th century.

The fortress presumably was totally self-sufficient during a siege, since there were no windows at all. Several small openings were made in the structure for the positioning of bows and arrows, which can be seen even today. There were a few secret passages under the walls of the castle which were found during the various renovation projects. These were the routes through which the soldiers could escape in case the castle had to be relinquished. The food for the animals and the soldiers were stored in very large quantities within the castle and the rain water was collected for drinking. The soldiers lived in the towers and the animals were kept in the open areas.

Todi Castle was important from both the military and geographic point of view. The castle stood along a common pilgrimage route to Rome and the area became quite wealthy due to commerce and trade. Todi flourished in the 13th century.

In 1348 the Black Plague struck and later in the mid-14th century the municipality of Todi collapsed. In the later years, the Castle of Capecchio even after the bubonic plague decimated the local countryside. The castle was also abandoned by the warriors and soldiers and then used by the wanderers.

During the 15th century, the castle was turned into a monastery. A roof was constructed in the courtyard and the space was transformed into a church dedicated to Saints Julietta and Quiricus.

Later, in the 17th century, the monastery was also abandoned and the castle became the object of dispute among several local lords. Lastly, the Landi family of Todi gained ownership of the castle. However, even then the castle remained abandoned for three hundred years. During those years the castle was sacked by armies, and occasionally occupied by bandits.

In the 18th century, the castle was acquired by the Paparini family, important landowners in the area of Moruzze and Todi. And then, in 1974, by Italian Ambassador Giuseppe Santoro and since then is owned by the Santoro family.

The restoration of the Castle of Capecchio, that took place from 1975 to 1980, was entrusted to three architects namely Marcello Confetti, Giorgio Leoni and Vittorio Garatti.

In 1980, the Castle of Capecchio was declared a national monument. The restoration work itself took as long as ten years. The name of the castle was changed several times over the centuries. It was known as Capecchio, Cassa Treia and Casa Arsiccia at various times. The area of this estate spans to 45-acres. The Castle was recently recognized as Residenza d 'Epoca, belonging to the National Heritage. It is also part of the prestigious Italian Castle circuit Institute, an international organization under the auspices of the UNESCO.

Architecture

The Estate is surrounded by 250 acres consisting of vineyards, olive groves, fruit trees and cypresses. 

In 13th-century, food for animals and soldiers was stored in large quantities within the castle. Rain water was collected for drinking. The soldiers lived in the towers and the animals were kept in the open areas. When the building became a monastery, the courtyard was roofed, and the space was transformed into a church dedicated to Saints Julietta and Quiricus.

The Castrum Ilionis

The Castrum Ilionis was one of the many castles built during the 13th century by the comune of Todi as part of its fortified system. The area of the Castrum was the scene of the clash between the Longobards and the Byzantines. Unfortunately, however, there are very few material testimonies of this tormented story. The most important indication comes from the local toponyms, which includes names of both Germanic and Latin origin, testify the land was disputed between Longobards and Byzantines.

From Charlemagne onwards, the territory was subdivided into feuds, principally: the Acts for the same Todi, the Montemarte for the northwestern area towards Orvieto, the Chiaravalle for the east, with the Acquasparta epicenter, the Arnolfi for Massa Bindi, Francisci for Baschi and finally Landi, dominating in the south of Todi between Vagli, Morre and Collelungo to the watershed of Monte Croce. The importance of these families is documented by the statute of the Comune of Todi dated 1337, which regulates the relations between these families, their feuds, and the comune; however, there are no boundary lines exactly defining the fiefs of many of the families.

For the Landi, their origin dates earlier than the commune.  The Castiglione or Castrum Ilionis, home of the Landi family, as well as the "Villa" in which the lord's subordinates live. The Landi also owned the contiguous Villa de Franconibus lived his people. Del Castrum remains a very well preserved tower, masonry, terrain, underground and defense bastions. Next to a space, the remains of a fortified village, a pievania and a cemetery are less well conserved. This area was completely abandoned in the 14th century for uncertain causes, but probably linked to an economic and social crisis that coincided with the spread of plague.

Villas on the Estate
The photo-artist Mario Santoro - Woith is the present owner of the Estate, also restored several historic facilities that were spread over the Estate, including a former olive oil mill (Villa Cipresso), a 19th Century stone farmhouse (Villa Pianesante), a Farm (Villa Campo Rinaldo) and a Cottage (Villa Carina).

Legends about ghosts
According to legend, the Landi family wanted to sell the castle in the 16th century when Lucrezia, Gerolamo Landi's wife died in 1723 while delivering her first child. She was buried in the castle, in the chapel. According to the locals, the ghost of Lucrezia still wanders through the rooms of the castle on many occasions.

References

External links

 Official website

todi
Todi
todi
Residential buildings completed in 1973
Buildings and structures in Todi
Villas in Umbria
Ruined castles in Italy
Buildings and structures completed in the 12th century